Michael Howard Bushby (29 July 1931 – 8 February 2020) was an English cricketer. He played 43 first-class matches for Cambridge University Cricket Club between 1952 and 1954. 

An opening batsman, Mike Bushby captained Cambridge University in 1954. His highest score was 113 against Lancashire in 1954.

Bushby spent his working life as a teacher at Tonbridge School, where he taught history. He ran the school's cricket from 1956 to 1972. He retired in 1991, and moved to a house 200 yards from the school.

References

External links
 

1931 births
2020 deaths
Cricketers from Cheshire
English cricketers
People educated at Dulwich College
Alumni of Queens' College, Cambridge
Cambridge University cricketers
Sportspeople from Macclesfield
Marylebone Cricket Club cricketers
Schoolteachers from Cheshire